Groesbeck is a city in and the county seat of Limestone County, Texas, United States. Its population was 3,631 at the 2020 census.  The community is named after a railroad employee.

History 
The city of Groesbeck was dedicated as a township by Houston and Texas Central Railroad in 1869. It was named for Abram Groesbeeck, a railroad director. The difference in spelling between the person and town is a result of the post office directives for simpler spelling. Development of its city government began in 1871. Groesbeck became the county seat of Limestone County in 1873, and is home to the "Million Dollar Courthouse".
Old Fort Parker Historical Site on the north side of Groesbeck is preserved to tell the story of Cynthia Ann Parker, who was captured by Comanches, and became the mother of Quannah Parker, the last Comanche chief. The last legal execution in Limestone County occurred on April 12, 1895, when Richard Burleson, who had been convicted of murdering James Garrett McKinnon, was hanged in front of the courthouse in Groesbeck.

Geography

Groesbeck is located at  (31.522907, –96.532125).

The community is located at the junction of State Highways 14 and 164.

Groesbeck is the closest town to historic Old Fort Parker. The fort holds an annual Christmas event at the site  every December.  The original fort has been rebuilt on the original site to the original specifications.

Demographics

As of the 2020 United States census, there were 3,631 people, 1,416 households, and 956 families residing in the city.

At the 2010 census, 4,328 people, 1,286 households, and 864 families lived in the city. The population density was 989 people/sq mi (382/km). The 1,473 housing units averaged 336.8/s mi (130/km). The racial makeup of the city was 65.36% White, 20.2% African American, 0.3% Native American, 0.03% Asian, 11.3% from other races, and 2.7% from two or more races. Hispanics or Latinos of any race were 20.9%.

Of the 1,286 households, 32.6% had children under 18 living with them, 45.8% were married couples living together, 17.0% had a female householder with no husband present, and 32.8% were not families. About 29.2% of households were one person and 13% were one person aged 65 or older. The average household size was 2.6, and the average family size was 3.25.

The age distribution in the city was 24.6% under 18, 8.4% from 19 to 24, 32.6% from 25 to 44, 21.1% from 45 to 64, and 13.2% 65 or older. The median age was 34.4 years.

Government
The City of Groesbeck is a type A general-law city.  The current mayor is Matthew Dawley. The five current city council members are Tamika Jackson, Warren Anglin, Kim Harris, Sonia Selvera, and Lee Cox.

The main source of water is the Navasota River.

Library
The city of Groesbeck has one public library, located at 601 W. Yeagua St., also known as Hwy. 164.

Education
The city of Groesbeck is served by the Groesbeck Independent School District,
which includes five different schools: Preschool, H.O.Whitehurst,Enge Washington, Groesbeck Middle School, and [Groesbeck High School].

Notable people

 Joe Don Baker, actor, was born in Groesbeck in 1936
 Larry Dossey, physician, was born Groesbeck in 1940
 Clay Hammond, R&B singer and songwriter, was born in Groesbeck in 1936
 John E. Hatley, a former master sergeant in the United States Army, is serving a 40-year sentence in the Fort Leavenworth Disciplinary Barracks for the murder of four Iraqi detainees. He attended high school in Greoesbeck
 Lenoy Jones, a National Football League (NFL) player, played for Groesbeck High School
 Garland Roark, author (Wake of the Red Witch)
 Kenneth Sims, first overall selection in the 1982 NFL Draft, inducted into College Football Hall of Fame Class of 2021, played for Groesbeck High School
 Frankie Smith, an NFL player, played for Groesbeck High School
 John Westbrook was the first African American to play football in the Southwest Conference; he was born in Groesbeck in 1947

References

External links

 
  Groesbeck Goats Football History Site  
 Local newspaper 
  Additional Groesbeck information 
 Old Fort Parker Historical Site

Cities in Texas
Cities in Limestone County, Texas
County seats in Texas
Populated places established in 1869
1869 establishments in Texas